Martin Mahďar (born 31 July 1989 in Dubnica nad Váhom) is a Slovak cyclist, who last rode for UCI Continental team .

Major results

2008
 3rd Road race, National Under-23 Road Championships
2009
 9th Overall Grand Prix Bradlo
2010
 1st Stage 3 Košice–Tatry–Košice
 5th Overall Carpathia Couriers Path
2011
 1st  Road race, National Under-23 Road Championships
 9th Banja Luka–Belgrade I
 9th Challenge du Prince – Trophée Princier
2013
 8th Overall Tour du Maroc
2014
 3rd Road race, National Road Championships
 10th Visegrad 4 Bicycle Race – GP Hungary
2016
 1st Stage 7 Tour du Cameroun
 9th Coupe des Carpathes
2017
 3rd Overall Grand Prix Chantal Biya
1st  Points classification
1st  Mountains classification
 10th Memorial Imre Riczu
2018
 3rd Overall Tour du Cameroun
 5th Road race, National Road Championships

References

External links

1989 births
Living people
Slovak male cyclists
People from Dubnica nad Váhom
Sportspeople from the Trenčín Region